Gresson is a surname. Notable people with the surname include:

Francis Gresson (1868–1949), English cricketer active from 1887 to 1901
Henry Barnes Gresson (1809–1901), New Zealand judge
Kenneth Gresson, KBE (1891–1974), New Zealand soldier, lawyer, university lecturer and judge
William Jardine Gresson (1869–1934), British merchant and politician in Hong Kong and China

See also
Gresson Street (機利臣街), a street in the Wan Chai area of Hong Kong Island, Hong Kong
Gress
Gresso
Gressoney (disambiguation)